Alexandros Hatzipetros (1907–2006) was a Greek military officer who served as Chief of the Central Intelligence Service and Deputy Minister for Foreign Affairs during the Regime of the Colonels.

Hatzipetros, a career soldier, was a descendant of freedom-fighter Christodoulos Hatzipetros. He was a Colonel in the Artillery when the coup d'état of 1967 which installed the Junta took place. In the wake of the coup, Hatzipetros was appointed Chief of the Central Intelligence Service, a post he held until June 1972. The following month, he assumed the position of Deputy Foreign Minister and remained in that position until the fall of the Junta in late 1973. He was tried and acquitted in the Greek Junta Trials.
Hatzipetros died in 2006.

References

1907 births
2006 deaths
Leaders of the Greek junta
Hellenic Army officers
National Intelligence Service (Greece)
People from Corinth